Korezar (also Romanized as Korezār; also known as Kareh Za, Kerezā, Koreh Zār, and Korezā) is a village in Sigar Rural District, in the Central District of Lamerd County, Fars Province, Iran. At the 2006 census, its population was 157, in 28 families.

References 

Populated places in Lamerd County